The 1915 U.S. Open was the 21st U.S. Open, held June 17–18 at Baltusrol Golf Club in Springfield, New Jersey, west of New York City. Four-time U.S. Amateur champion Jerome Travers captured his only U.S. Open title, one stroke ahead of runner-up Tom McNamara. The championship was played on the original course at Baltusrol, now known as the Old Course, which no longer exists.

Future U.S. Open champions Jim Barnes and Chick Evans shared the first round lead, with Travers five behind. After a 72 in the second round, Travers pulled to within two-shots of leaders Barnes and Louis Tellier.

Travers took the lead in the third round with a 73, a shot ahead of Barnes, Tellier, Bob MacDonald, and Mike Brady, with McNamara two behind. MacDonald shot a 78 in the final round to finish in third, while Barnes and Tellier both shot 79 to finish in fourth. McNamara posted a 75 to total 298 as Travers made the turn at 39, and needed a 37 on the back-nine to win the title. His drive at the 10th went out of bounds, while his second shot found the rough. His third shot cleared the water surrounding the green and settled less than three feet (0.9 m) from the hole. He managed to save par with a 15-footer (4.5 m) at the 11th, three-putted for bogey at the 12th, but then made a birdie at 15. Pars over the final three holes saw him finish with a 76 and a 297 total.

Shortly after this win, Travers announced his retirement from competitive golf and never played in the U.S. Open again.

Defending champion Walter Hagen finished nine strokes back, in a tie for tenth place.

The Old Course at Baltusrol was plowed under three years later in 1918 by course architect A. W. Tillinghast to create the Upper and Lower Courses.

Past champions in the field 

Source:

Round summaries

First round
Thursday, June 17, 1915 (morning)

Source:

Second round
Thursday, June 17, 1915 (afternoon)

Source:

Third round
Friday, June 18, 1915 (morning)

Source:

Final round
Friday, June 18, 1915 (afternoon)

Source:

Amateurs: Travers (+1), Evans (+11), Stone (+12), Ouimet (+21).

References

External links
USGA Championship Database
USOpen.com - 1915

U.S. Open (golf)
Golf in New Jersey
Springfield Township, Union County, New Jersey
U.S. Open (golf)
U.S. Open (golf)
U.S. Open
U.S. Open (golf)